Stigmella oriastra is a moth of the family Nepticulidae. It is found in New Zealand.

The length of the forewings is about 3 mm. Adults have been recorded in January and from October to December. There is probably one generation per year.

The larvae feed on Celmisia species, including Celmisia coriacea. They mine the leaves of their host plant. The mine consists of a narrow gallery, initially in a circular pattern and later linear. The frass is deposited in the middle of the mine. Larva have been recorded in February, April and May. They are 3–4 mm long and pale yellow.

The cocoon is buff and spun among debris on the ground.

References

External links
Fauna of New Zealand - Number 16: Nepticulidae (Insecta: Lepidoptera)

Nepticulidae
Moths of New Zealand
Endemic fauna of New Zealand
Moths described in 1917
Taxa named by Edward Meyrick
Endemic moths of New Zealand